Table tennis at the 2011 Island Games was held from 26 June–1 July 2011 at the Ryde School.

Events

Medal table

As all events except the Mixed Team bracket had no third place match, two bronze medals were awarded per event.

Men

Women

Mixed

Results

Team

Group A

Group B

Playoff 9–11

Playoffs 5–8

Semifinals

Ninth place game

Seventh place game

Fifth place game

Bronze place game

Gold place game

References
Table tennis at the 2011 Island Games

2011 Island Games
2011 in table tennis
2011
2011 Island Games